Stanislav Jirkal (15 November 1955 – November 2002) was a Czech sports shooter. He competed at the 1992 Summer Olympics and the 1996 Summer Olympics.

References

External links
 

1955 births
2002 deaths
Czech male sport shooters
Olympic shooters of Czechoslovakia
Olympic shooters of the Czech Republic
Shooters at the 1992 Summer Olympics
Shooters at the 1996 Summer Olympics
Sportspeople from Kladno